Summerfield High School may refer to:

Summerfield High School (Louisiana) in Summerfield, Louisiana
Summerfield High School (Michigan) in Petersburg, Michigan

See also
Summerfield School (disambiguation)